Grindstone is a tool used for sharpening

Grindstone may also refer to:
A type of millstone used to grind grains such as wheat
Grindstone (horse), 1996 Kentucky Derby winner and sire of the racehorse Birdstone
Grindstone (album), 2007 album by the Norwegian band Shining
Grindstone (time tracking software), a program that allows users to create and organize tasks and to track time
Grindstone 100 Miler, a  ultramarathon in Virginia
Grindstone (video game), a 2019 video game by Capybara Games
Places:
Grindstone, Pennsylvania
Grindstone, South Dakota
Grindstone, Manitoba, a peninsula and part of the Hecla-Grindstone Provincial Park in Manitoba, Canada.
Grindstone Butte, a summit in South Dakota
Grindstone City Historic District in Port Austin Township, Michigan
Grindstone Island (Magdalen Islands), an island in the Magdalen Islands, Quebec, Canada
Grindstone Island (Ontario), is an island in Big Rideau Lake, Ontario, Canada.
Grindstone Island, is one of the Thousand Islands, in the St. Lawrence River in the United States of America.